Jessie Lake is an unincorporated community in Lake Jessie Township, Itasca County, Minnesota, United States, located within the Chippewa National Forest. The community is located between Wirt and Talmoon; along Itasca County Road 4.

Nearby places include Wirt, Spring Lake, Bowstring, Talmoon, and Marcell. Jessie Lake is located 14 miles southeast of Wirt and two miles west of Talmoon. Jessie Lake is 22 miles north of Deer River.

Jessie Lake is located within ZIP code 56637, based in Talmoon.

See also
 Lake Jessie Township

References

 Official State of Minnesota Highway Map – 2011/2012 edition
 Mn/DOT map of Itasca County – Sheet 2 – 2011 edition

Unincorporated communities in Minnesota
Unincorporated communities in Itasca County, Minnesota